Wrzosówka may refer to the following places:
Wrzosówka, Lublin Voivodeship (east Poland)
Wrzosówka, Masovian Voivodeship (east-central Poland)
Wrzosówka, Świętokrzyskie Voivodeship (south-central Poland)